The 3 arrondissements of the Ariège department are:
 Arrondissement of Foix, (prefecture of the Ariège department: Foix) with 115 communes. The population of the arrondissement was 47,572 in 2016.  
 Arrondissement of Pamiers, (subprefecture: Pamiers) with 90 communes.  The population of the arrondissement was 64,938 in 2016.
 Arrondissement of Saint-Girons, (subprefecture: Saint-Girons) with 121 communes.  The population of the arrondissement was 40,557 in 2016.

History

In 1800 the arrondissements of Foix, Pamiers and Saint-Girons were established. The arrondissement of Pamiers was disbanded in 1926, and restored in 1942. 

The borders of the arrondissements of Ariège were modified in January 2017:
 21 communes from the arrondissement of Foix to the arrondissement of Pamiers 
 13 communes from the arrondissement of Foix to the arrondissement of Saint-Girons
 18 communes from the arrondissement of Pamiers to the arrondissement of Foix
 27 communes from the arrondissement of Pamiers to the arrondissement of Saint-Girons

References

Ariege